The second season of American talent show competition series America's Got Talent was broadcast on NBC from June 5 to August 21, 2007. The network originally intended for it to run during its winter schedule that year, but opted against it following concerns over it clashing with other popular programs at that time. After the success of its first year, additional episodes of the series were commissioned by NBC, with changes being made to the program's format for the new season. These included the addition of a "boot camp" stage during the auditions, and the use of the judge's buzzers matching other editions of the Got Talent franchise, particularly after the first season of Britain's Got Talent.

While Piers Morgan and David Hasselhoff returned as judges, Regis Philbin did not return as host for the new season, and was replaced by tabloid talk show host Jerry Springer. Brandy Norwood was unable to return as a judge following the previous season, due to an ongoing lawsuit against her at the time, and was replaced by Sharon Osbourne as a result. The second season was won by singing ventriloquist and impressionist Terry Fator, with singer and guitarist Cas Haley finishing in second place, and singing beatboxer Butterscotch placing third.

Season overview 

Following the success of the first season of America's Got Talent, NBC opted to commission further seasons of the program for the foreseeable future. As part of the network's original plan for the second season, the new episodes were intended to broadcast during the network's Winter 2007 schedule, with the results of each live round aired on the same day. However, concerns that such a decision would place America's Got Talent in a direct competition for viewing ratings with the sixth season of American Idol, due to being aired around the same period. NBC eventually dropped the plan, and set the program up for its Summer schedule that year, allocating the arranged broadcasting slot of Grease: You're The One That I Want.

The second season had a considerable change in the format of the program, to match a more standardized arrangement being used across the Got Talent franchise. The most notable change was the filmed auditions being split into two stages, with the first taking place across a selection of cities, and the second stage operating in Las Vegas under a "boot camp" format titled "Las Vegas Callbacks". The second stage's rules focused on those who made it through the first stage being placed into one of two groups: "music" and "variety", having to successfully impress the judges across two rounds of performances, with each three minutes in length and conducted without interruptions from the judges. The other change was to incorporate the live round rules for judges used on other editions of Got Talent, particularly Britain's Got Talent. The new arrangement primarily saw judges giving feedback on a performance when it had ended but still using their buzzers to stop performances, while the public voted on who moved to the next stage in the semi-finals. Other than these changes, the second season did not incorporate the use of Wildcard acts, while the results for each live round (except the final), were each given before the start of the next round.

Auditions took place during Spring 2007, with auditions being conducted within the cities of New York, Los Angeles, Chicago, and Dallas. Following the previous season, prior to filming taking place, replacements to the cast were made. Regis Philbin, who did not to return for undisclosed reasons, was replaced by Jerry Springer as host. Brandy Norwood was replaced by Sharon Osbourne as judge, after she dropped out due to a difficult legal matter she was dealing with.

Twenty of the participants who auditioned for this season secured a place in the two live semi-finals, with ten acts in each moving on to compete against each other in two "knock-out" finals. This resulted in four left to compete in a grand-final round. These are the results of each participant's overall performance during the season:

 |  |  |

Semi-finals summary
 Buzzed out |

Semi-final 1 (July 17)

Semi-final 2 (July 24)

Finals summary
 |  | 
 |  |  Buzzed (Top 10 & 8 Finals only)

Finals - Top 10 (July 31)

Finals - Top 8 (August 7)

Grand-final (August 14)

References

2007 American television seasons
America's Got Talent seasons